Be Still Please is an album by Portastatic. It was released on Merge Records on October 10, 2006.

The album was recorded at Pox Studios with Zeno Gill, with additional recording at Room 8 in Carrboro, North Carolina. It was mixed at Overdub Lane in Durham, North Carolina, with John Plymale.

Track listing 
 "Sour Shores"
 "Black Buttons"
 "I'm in Love (with Arthur Dove)"
 "Sweetness and Light"
 "Getting Saved"
 "You Blanks"
 "Like a Pearl"
 "Cheers and Applause"
 "Song for a Clock"

Notes 

2003 albums
Portastatic albums
Merge Records albums